What A Week was a radio comedy show on CBC Radio One that ran for two 13-episode seasons in 2003.

This show, like its more immediate predecessor The Muckraker was firmly rooted in the political and topical lampoons that first became a staple on Canadian airwaves with Royal Canadian Air Farce. Typical shows poked fun at the previous week's top newsmakers using a combination of impressions, sketch comedy and satirical songs.

The show was written by Dean Jenkinson, Paul Mather, Al Rae, Jerry Schaefer and George Westerholm, and featured the voices of Tony Daniels, Deann deGruijter, Ray Landry and Ron Rubin.

CBC Radio One programs
Canadian radio sketch shows
2003 radio programme debuts
2003 radio programme endings